The Marine Department of the Hong Kong Government is responsible for maintaining safety and environmental protection of the harbour (Port of Hong Kong), ships registered/foreign ships in Hong Kong and monitor shipping traffic in Hong Kong Waters, search and rescue operations for large waters of the South China Sea.

Its head office is in the Harbour Building in Central, Hong Kong.

It also conducts investigations of marine accidents.

The department is led by the Director of Marine, Agnes Wong, who reports to the Secretary for Transport and Housing.

The Marine Department is also responsible for co-ordinating search and rescue operations in the waters around Hong Kong:

 Hong Kong Maritime Rescue Co-ordination Centre - search and rescue
 administer ship registration in Hong Kong
 ensure compliance with international and marine laws
 ensure compliance with environmental protection standards and combat pollution (namely oil spills)
 provide and maintain government vessels (Government Dockyard)
 facilitate the safe and expeditious movement of ships

Hong Kong is a major cargo port—175 million tonnes of cargo went through its port and 18.1 million TEU in 2000. The Marine Department is and acts as the port authority of the territory.

Facilities
  of quays - Kwai Chung and Stonecutters container terminals
  of quays at public cargo working areas
 58 mooring buoys for ocean-going vessels
 2 ferry terminals
 Marine Department port facility - former Royal Navy base - HMS Tamar on Stonecutters Island (500 operational vessels)
 All lighthouses in the territory — List of lighthouses in Hong Kong

History
Marine Department, called the Harbour Department in the early days, is in charge of harbour affairs and manage various aviation activities.
Marine Department was under the Economic Service Branch before 1997, and the Economic Development and Labour Bureau before 2007. Marine Department has now been under Transport and Housing Bureau since 1 July 2007.

Reformation
On 19 April 2013, Lamma Island Accident Investigation Board submitted a 238-page report about the 2012 Lamma Island ferry collision to the Hong Kong Government. On 30 April 2013, the chief executive, Leung Chun Ying, announced the report of Lamma Island accident and noted that the report detailed analyze the causes of the collision, the reason of why the vessel sank quickly and serious injuries; Also Marine Department has a series of problem of regulating vessels, he said that government will take it seriously this year, they will draw a lesson and make improvements. He said that he has instructed the Transport and Housing Bureau and the Marine Department to adopt the contents of the report, and full implementation, in order to improve maritime safety in Hong Kong. If the incident involves officials of human error and misconduct, the Hong Kong government will strictly deal with it, including disciplinary hearings  On the same day, Secretary for Transport and Housing Anthony announced the establishment of the Marine Department, reform Steering Committee, chaired by him, the leadership of two members, and later announced that appointees were former Ombudsman Alice Tai and Arts Development Advisory Committee Koo, respectively term two years. He said the Hong Kong government will learn a lesson, pay special attention to the report loopholes and deficiencies relating to the Marine Department system; committee will be a comprehensive review of the system of the Marine Department, including management, licensing regulatory, enforcement and inspections and other matters, and launched reform program and timetable. In addition, he said that it has obtained the consent of CSB, to send them a Grade B officer to become the Deputy Director of Marine, and assisted by an assist Director of Marine Department dealing with the maritime affairs reformation, an additional two Assistant Director of Marine will help them. The Marine Department will invite international experts to give advice to strengthen its reform efforts. Director of Marine Liaohan Bo said the Marine Department will cooperate a fully reforms, including the establishment of the Executive Team to co-ordinate inspection Affairs. Committee Secretary for Transport and Housing Anthony leadership will supervise the Director of Marine comprehensive examination and a thorough reform of the Marine Department, and to develop a timetable to implement the reform program.

May 21, 2013, reform of the Steering Committee held its first meeting of the Marine Department, to determine the terms of reference of the committee, including three points: first review the regulation of passenger safety and inspection aspects of Hong Kong vessel, the elaboration of a detailed reform plan, implement and monitor programs; second is review of Marine Department and reorganization of operations management processes, operating procedures and oversight structure, in order to strengthen internal control department governance; finally to formulate strategies to solve the case of shortage of personnel departments, and developing training programs. Thereafter, the Commission will hold a meeting once every two weeks. Reform of Marine Affairs Steering Committee is divided into two phases; the first phase of the Marine Department will inspect the various departments to understand processes and procedures in the hope within 4–6 months to improve existing procedures and practices to submit proposals, and be implemented, which then deep reform of the Marine Department to conduct a review.

References

See also

 Hong Kong Police Force
 Marine Region

Hong Kong government departments and agencies
Water transport in Hong Kong
Hong Kong
Maritime safety